Mount Goodale is a mountain with double summits,  high, standing  southeast of Mount Thorne in the Hays Mountains of the Queen Maud Mountains of Antarctica. It was discovered in December 1929 by the Byrd Antarctic Expedition geological party under Laurence Gould, and named by Richard E. Byrd after Edward E. Goodale, a member of that party. From 1959 to 1968 Goodale served as United States Antarctic Research Program Representative in Christchurch, New Zealand, and facilitated the passage of thousands of researchers to Antarctica and return.

References

External links
 The Papers of Edward E. Goodale at Dartmouth College Library

Mountains of the Ross Dependency
Amundsen Coast